Namsuru is a village in Kargil district of the Indian union territory of Ladakh. The village is located 88 kilometres from district headquarters Kargil.

Demographics
According to the 2011 census of India, Hardas has 108 households. The literacy rate of Namsuru village is 48.70%. In Namsuru, Male literacy stands at 61.56% while the female literacy rate was 34.30%.

Transport

Road
Namsuru is connected to other places in Ladakh by the NH 301.

Rail
The nearest railway station to Namsuru is the Sopore railway station located at a distance of 305 kilometres.

Air
The nearest airport is at Kargil located at a distance of 94 kilometres but it is currently non-operational. The next nearest major airport is Leh Airport located at a distance of 301 kilometres.

See also
Ladakh
Kargil
Suru Valley
Rangdum

References

Villages in Taisuru tehsil